Prefrontal may refer to:

Prefrontal bone, a  skull bone in some tetrapods
Prefrontal cortex, a region of the brain of a mammal
Prefrontal scales, a set of scales near the tip of the snout of a reptile